George Foulkes may refer to:
 George Ernest Foulkes (1878–1960), United States Representative from Michigan
 George Foulkes, Baron Foulkes of Cumnock (born 1942), Scottish politician